The 2021–22 Miami Hurricanes men's basketball team represented the University of Miami during the 2021–22 NCAA Division I men's basketball season. Led by eleventh-year head coach Jim Larrañaga, they played their home games at the Watsco Center on the university's campus in Coral Gables, Florida as members of the Atlantic Coast Conference (ACC).

The Hurricanes finished the season 26–11, 14–6 in ACC play to finish in fourth place. In the ACC Tournament they defeated Boston College in the quarterfinals before losing to eventual runners-up Duke in the semifinals. They received an at-large bid to the NCAA Tournament where they defeated USC, Auburn and Iowa State to advance to the first Elite Eight in school history where they lost to the eventual National Champion Kansas Jayhawks.

Previous season
The Hurricanes finished the 2020–21 season 10–17, 4–15 in ACC play to finish in thirteenth place.  In the ACC tournament they defeated Pittsburgh in the first round, and Clemson in the second round, before losing to eventual champions Georgia Tech in the quarterfinals.  They were not invited to either the NCAA tournament or NIT.

Offseason

Departures

Incoming transfers

2021 recruiting class

Roster

Schedule and results
Source:

|-
!colspan=12 style=| Exhibition

|-
!colspan=12 style=| Regular season

|-

|-
!colspan=12 style=| ACC tournament

|-
!colspan=12 style=| NCAA tournament

Rankings

*AP does not release post-NCAA Tournament rankings

References

Miami Hurricanes men's basketball seasons
Miami
Miami Hurricanes men's basketball team
Miami Hurricanes men's basketball team
Miami